The Mybi card is a kind of contactless smartcard used in South Korea. This system was introduced  in 2000 as a new fare collection system for the Busan area. now discontinued. see cashBee. Lotte started new name and united fare card. (eB card -> Upass + Mybi = cashBee)

Technology
Mybi uses MIFARE Standard 1k and PROX technology.

Compatibility
KB Free Pass and KTX Family Card are Mybi-compatible system.

Areas
Mybi is now used in many areas.
Busan (Digital Busan Card): subway, taxi, bus, toll road, parking lot
Ulsan (Digital Ulsan Card): bus
Jinju (Digital Gyeongnam Card): bus
Changwon (Digital Gyeongnam Card): bus
Gimhae (Gimhae For You Card): bus
Yangsan (Digital Gyeongnam Card): bus
Sacheon (Digital Gyeongnam Card): bus
Gimcheon, Gumi (Sinnari Card): bus
Gyeongju (Digital Busan Card, Digital Ulsan Card): bus
Gwangju (Bitgoeul Card): subway, bus
Chuncheon: bus
Wonju: bus
Tae Bak, Pyeong Chang, Samcheok, Gang Reung, Sok Cho, Yeong Weol, Jeong Sun: Bus
Seoul: bus, and subway
all Chungcheongbukdo area (Ettum e-Card): bus
all Chungcheongnamdo area (Digital Chungnam Card): bus
all Jeollabukdo area (Sinmyungie Card): bus
all Jeollanamdo area (Digital Yehyang Jeonnam Card): bus
AREX

See also
Hanaro Card
KTX Family Card

References

External links
English Official homepage

Transport in South Korea
Contactless smart cards
Fare collection systems in South Korea